Peter Rivera (born November 12, 1946) is an American politician who represented District 76 in the New York State Assembly, which comprises West Farms, Van Nest, Castle Hill and Parkchester. He later served as the New York State Commissioner of Labor.

Early life and education 
Born in Ponce, Puerto Rico, Rivera earned a degree in business administration from Pace University in 1968, and a J.D. from St. John's University School of Law in 1974. The following year, he was admitted to the New York State Bar Association.

Career 
Rivera began his career as a patrolman and detective with the New York Police Department in the South Bronx. Rivera then became an agent with the Drug Enforcement Administration. After graduating from law school, he began to work as an assistant district attorney in the Homicide Bureau of the Bronx County District Attorney's Office. He has been in private law practice since 1978.

First elected to the Assembly in 1992, Rivera was the Chairman of the New York Assembly's Puerto Rican/Hispanic Task force and Assembly Committee on Mental Health, Mental Retardation, and Developmental Disabilities. He was the highest-ranking self-described Latino officeholder within the State Assembly.

In the summer of 2010, The New York Times reported that Rivera would face a Democratic primary election challenge from Bronx lawyer Luis R. Sepúlveda. Rivera went on to defeat Sepulveda in the 2010 primary.

Rivera resigned from his assembly seat in 2012 to take the position of New York State Commissioner of Labor.

References

External links
Biography: New York State Democratic Committee
New York State Assembly Member Website

1946 births
Living people
Attorneys from Ponce
American politicians of Puerto Rican descent
Drug Enforcement Administration agents
Democratic Party members of the New York State Assembly
New York City Police Department officers
New York (state) lawyers
Hispanic and Latino American state legislators in New York (state)
Politicians from the Bronx
Politicians from Ponce
Puerto Rican law enforcement personnel
Pace University alumni
St. John's University School of Law alumni
21st-century American politicians